The Pakistan national cricket team toured New Zealand in December to January 2003–04 and played a two-match Test series against the New Zealand national cricket team. Pakistan won the series 1–0. New Zealand were captained by Stephen Fleming and Pakistan by Inzamam-ul-Haq. In addition, the teams played a five-match series of Limited Overs Internationals (LOI) which New Zealand won 4–1.

Test series summary

1st Test

2nd Test

One Day Internationals (ODIs)

1st ODI

2nd ODI

3rd ODI

4th ODI

5th ODI

References

External links

2003 in Pakistani cricket
2004 in Pakistani cricket
2003 in New Zealand cricket
2004 in New Zealand cricket
International cricket competitions in 2003–04
2003–04 New Zealand cricket season
2003